Voice(s) in the Night may refer to:

Books and stories
 "The Voice in the Night", a story by William Hope Hodgson
 Voices in the Night: Rare Stories by William Hope Hodgson 2009 
 Voices in the Night, a novel by Flora Steel 1900
 Voices in the Night, by Charles Albertson 1943
 Voices in the Night, the prison poems of Dietrich Bonhoeffer 1999
 Voices in the Night, by Rhoda Bacmeister and Ann Grifalconi 1965
 Voices in the Night, stories by Steven Millhauser 2015
 Voices in the Night, by Andrew Coburn (author) 1994

Films
Voice in the Night (film), a 1934 American action film
Freedom Radio (American title: A Voice in the Night), a 1941 British anti-Nazi film
Wanted for Murder (film), a 1946 British crime film with the alternative title A Voice in the Night
Voices in the Night  (Las voces de la noche), a 2003 Spanish film

Television episodes
"Voice in the Night", from William Tell  1958  
"Voice in the Night", from Barnaby Jones 1976  
"Voices in the Night", from Bakugan Battle Brawlers
"Voices in the Night", from Ozzie's Girls 1973
"The Voice in the Night", from The Legend of Korra
"The Voice in the Night", from Suspicion 1958

Music

Albums
Voice in the Night (Charles Lloyd album)
A Voice in the Night, jazz album by Carla White 2006
Voices in the Night (Twelfth Night album), two-CD compilation album 2008
Voices In the Night, by Silverline 2010

Songs
"Voice in the Night", a song by Charles Lloyd composed Lloyd from Voice in the Night (Charles Lloyd album)
"Voice in the Night", a song by Chico Hamilton
"Voice in the Night", a song by Ernest Wilson And His Modern Sequence Orchestra With The Trafalgar Squares, Wilson  	1968
"Voice in the Night", a song by Bruno Nicolai  for the 1970 film Eugenie… The Story of Her Journey into Perversion
"A Voice in the Night", a pseudo piano concerto written by composer Mischa Spoliansky for the 1946 film Wanted for Murder
"A Voice in the Night", a song by The Barratt Band, Barratt	1981
"Voices in the Night", a song by Larry Norman
"Voices in the Night", a song by  Jim Capaldi composed by Miles Waters and Peter Vale
"Voices in the Night", a song by Mass (band) composed by Mass
"Voices in the Night", a song by The Generators composed by Doug Dagger and The Generators
"Voices in the Night", a song composed by Steve Adams

See also
 The Voice of the Night, a Dean Koontz novel
 Voices of the Night, by Henry Wadsworth Longfellow 1839
 Voices of the Night, by Lennox Berkeley (1903–1989)